Receptor-type tyrosine-protein phosphatase beta or VE-PTP is an enzyme specifically expressed in endothelial cells  that in humans is encoded by the PTPRB gene.

Function 

VE-PTP is a member of the classical protein tyrosine phosphatase (PTP) family. The deletion of the gene in mouse models was shown to be embryonically lethal, thus indicating that it is important for vasculogenesis and blood vessel development.  In addition, it was shown to participate in adherens junctions complex and regulate vascular permeability. Recently, Soni et al. have shown that tyrosine phosphorylation of VE-PTP via Pyk2 kinase downstream of STIM1-induced calcium entry mediates disassembly of the endothelial adherens junctions.

Interactions 

VE-PTP contains an extracellular domain composed of multiple fibronectin type_III repeats, a single transmembrane segment and one intracytoplasmic catalytic domain, thus belongs to R3 receptor subtype PTPs. 
The extracellular region was shown to interact with the angiopoietin receptor Tie-2 and with the adhesion protein VE-cadherin.

VE-PTP was also found to interact with Grb2 and plakoglobin through its cytoplasmatic domain.

Role in disease
Dysregulation of PTPRB correlates with the development of a variety of tumors. PTPRB promotes metastasis of colorectal cancer cells via inducing epithelial-mesenchymal transition (EMT).

References

Further reading